Romance of the Redwoods is a 1939 American adventure film directed by Charles Vidor and starring Charles Bickford, Jean Parker and Gordon Oliver. It is based on the 1899 short story The White Silence by  Jack London.

Plot
June Martin is a dishwasher in a California logging camp boarding house. Steve Blake fights Jed Malone for her and loses, thus casting suspicion on himself when Malone dies under cloudy circumstances.

Cast
 Charles Bickford as Steve Blake 
 Jean Parker as June Martin 
 Al Bridge as Boss Whittaker 
 Gordon Oliver as Jed Malone
 Ann Shoemaker as Mother Manning
 Lloyd Hughes as Eddie Carter
 Pat O'Malley as Yerkes
 Marc Lawrence as Joe
 Earl Gunn as Socko 
 Don Beddoe as Forbes
 Erville Alderson as Jackson
 Lee Prather as Judge Hanley

See also
 List of American films of 1939

References

External links

1939 films
American adventure films
1939 adventure films
American black-and-white films
Films set in forests
Films about lumberjacks
Films based on works by Jack London
Columbia Pictures films
Films directed by Charles Vidor
1930s American films
Films set in California
1930s English-language films